Georg Wolfgang Knorr (30 December 1705, in Nürnberg – 17 September 1761, in Nürnberg) was a German engraver and naturalist.

Works
Deliciae Naturae Selectae Oder Auserlefenes Naturalien Cabinet (1766–67)
Les Délices Des Yeux et de L'espirit, ou Collection Generale des Differentes Espèces de Coquillages (1764–73).
Sammlung von Merckwürdigkeiten der Natur und Alterthümern des Erdbodens welche petrificirte Cörper enthält aufgewiesen und beschrieben A. Bieling, Nürnberg, 1755

References
Wilhelm Adolf Schmidt In: Allgemeine Deutsche Biographie (ADB). Band 15, Duncker & Humblot, Leipzig 1882, S. 736–738.
Knorr, Georg Wolfgang / Walch, Johann Ernst Immanuel: Die Naturgeschichte der Versteinerungen zur Erläuterung der Knorrischen Sammlung von Merkwürdigkeiten der Natur. Bd.: 1, Nürnberg (1773)

External links
Zoologica Göttingen State and University Library  Deliciæ Naturae  Selectæ oder auserlesenes Naturalien Cabinet online
Knorr, George Wolfgang (1768) Deliciæ naturæ selectæ - digital facsimile available from the Linda Hall Library. A selection of high-resolution images from this book can be found here.
Digitised books by George Wolfgang Knorr in the Biodiversity Heritage Library.

1761 deaths
German naturalists
1705 births